The men's singles event at the 2018 Mediterranean Games was held from 26 to 30 June at the Tarragona Tennis Club.

Lamine Ouahab of Morocco won the gold medal, defeating Lucas Catarina of Monaco in the final, 6–2, 6–3.

Jacopo Berrettini of Italy won the bronze medal, defeating Amine Ahouda of Morocco in the bronze medal match, 6–0, 3–0 ret.

Medalists

Seeds

Draw

Finals

Top half

Bottom half

External links
 Draw

Tennis at the 2018 Mediterranean Games